Football Manager 2018 is a 2017 football management simulation video game developed by Sports Interactive and published by Sega  which was released worldwide on 10 November 2017 for Microsoft Windows, macOS and Linux. The Nintendo Switch version by Lab42 was released later, on 13 April 2018. For the first time in the series, all three versions of the game, FM 18 for PC, Mac and Linux, FM Touch 2018 for PC, Mac, Linux, iOS and Android, and Football Manager Mobile 2018 for iOS and Android were all released on the same day.

Gameplay
FM18 features similar gameplay to that of the Football Manager series. Gameplay consists of taking charge of a professional association football team, as the team manager. Players can sign football players to contracts, manage finances for the club, and give team talks to players. FM18 is a simulation of real world management, with the player being judged on various factors by the club's AI owners and board.

Development
FM 18 was developed by Sports Interactive and published by Sega. The first details of new features and upgrades in Football Manager 2018 would not be announced until late September, with FM Touch additions following in October via the game's official website and social media channels. New editions of the football game included updated squads and kits, and improvements to the match engine, among other features.

Players who pre-purchased Football Manager 2018 through a SEGA approved digital retailer will be able to start pre-season at least two weeks prior to the official street date through a fully playable beta version. Single-player careers started in the Beta can be also continued in the full game.

A screenshot from the beta-build of the game confirmed that the possibility for players to come out as homosexual was added for FM 18. Only computer-generated players can possibly come out, not already existing ones. Such an occurrence results in a small news report and a boost in revenue.

Featured leagues
Football Manager 2018 contained the same playable leagues as Football Manager 2017 during release but Indonesian League is reduced from 3 playable levels to 2 playable levels. English League has the most playable levels (up to 6) while Swedish League has the most playable divisions (up to 10). The total number of playable divisions is 147 (116 levels, 52 countries), with over 2,500 clubs available.

Release
The management simulation video game was launched for PC, Mac, and Linux on 10 November. For the first time, the mobile and tablet versions Football Manager Mobile 2018 and Football Manager Touch 2018 were all launched simultaneously with the desktop version, as they also arrived on 10 November. Players who had previous versions of the series (Football Manager 2017, Football Manager 2016 etc.) could get up to a 25% discount on the game on pre-ordering. Football Manager Touch 2018 was later released for the Nintendo Switch on 13 April 2018.

Reception

Football Manager 2018 for PC and Football Manager 2018 Touch for Switch received "generally favorable" reviews according to review aggregator Metacritic.

PC Gamer gave the game a score of 89/100, saying the game is the most ambitious instalment yet from the previous versions. GameSpot gave the game a 9/10, talking about how the dynamics broadens with the ways you interact with your team, more information about how and why your players are injured allows you to adjust, the increased scouting makes unearthing hidden gems more rewarding and also a slew of new player animations and increased intelligence improves the 3D match engine. Eurogamer wrote positively about the game's day one polish and the small iterations made to it from last year's entry, stating, "In the end it's a combination of doing a handful of new things well and avoiding a long list of prior release day issues that earns Football Manager 2018 the privilege of a veteran player's time all over again." PCGamesN awarded the game a nine out of ten, writing, "In general, what all of this adds up to is a more sensitive game. All of the depth is there as before, but the humanity of football is represented in a greater way..." GamesRadar+ praised the improvements made to the 3D Match Engine and criticized the user interface and dynamics system.

Notes

References

External links

2018
Brexit in fiction
Sega video games
Windows games
MacOS games
Linux games
Video games developed in the United Kingdom
2017 video games
Nintendo Switch games